Francis Kane may refer to:

 Francis Kane (ice hockey) (1923–2016), Canadian ice hockey player
 Francis J. Kane (born 1942), American prelate of the Roman Catholic Church
 Francis X. Kane (1918–2013), American space planner and engineer

See also
Frank Kane (1895–1962), Major League Baseball outfielder